Maoripsocus is a genus of lizard barklice in the family Caeciliusidae. There are at least 21 described species in Maoripsocus. The genus was first described by Robin Tillyard in 1923.

Species
These 21 species belong to the genus Maoripsocus:

 Maoripsocus aequalis (Broadhead & Alison Richards, 1982) c g
 Maoripsocus africanus (Ribaga, 1911) i c g b
 Maoripsocus concavistigma (Schmidt, E. R. & Thornton, 1993) c g
 Maoripsocus dimorphus (Smithers, Courtenay, 1992) c g
 Maoripsocus ericifoliae (Schmidt, E. R. & Thornton, 1993) c g
 Maoripsocus fastigatus (Smithers, Courtenay, 1969) c g
 Maoripsocus frater (Broadhead & Alison Richards, 1982) c g
 Maoripsocus griseus (Smithers, Courtenay, 1993) c g
 Maoripsocus hobartensis Schmidt, E. R. & New, 2008 c g
 Maoripsocus juneae (Schmidt, E. R. & Thornton, 1993) c g
 Maoripsocus koriflae (Arahou, 1984) c g
 Maoripsocus lobatus (Smithers, Courtenay, 1998) c g
 Maoripsocus macrostigma (Enderlein, 1903) c g
 Maoripsocus pedderi Schmidt, E. R. & New, 2008 c g
 Maoripsocus semifuscatus Tillyard, 1923 c g
 Maoripsocus spiralosus Schmidt, E. R. & New, 2008 c g
 Maoripsocus tahunensis Schmidt, E. R. & New, 2008 c g
 Maoripsocus tugloensis (Smithers, Courtenay, 1993) c g
 Maoripsocus wedgei Schmidt, E. R. & New, 2008 c g
 Maoripsocus weindorferi Schmidt, E. R. & New, 2008 c g
 Maoripsocus wilsoni (Schmidt, E. R. & Thornton, 1993) c g

Data sources: i = ITIS, c = Catalogue of Life, g = GBIF, b = Bugguide.net

References

Caeciliusidae
Articles created by Qbugbot